The 2018 Seniors Masters was a senior snooker tournament which took place on 12 April 2018 at  in Sheffield, England. It was the fourth and final event on the newly created World Seniors Tour.

Cliff Thorburn won the title beating Jonathan Bagley 2–1 on a re-spotted black ball which replaced the final frame decider in the final. Thorburn, at the age of 70, became the oldest winner of a World Seniors title; the previous record belonged to Steve Davis, who was 60 when he won the 2018 Seniors Irish Masters.

Prize fund
The breakdown of prize money is shown below:
Winner: £7,500
Runner-up: £2,500
Semi-finals: £1,000
Quarter-finals: £500
Highest break: £500
Total: £14,500

Main Draw

 All matches were played with a 30-second shot clock with players having two time-outs per match
 *Re-spotted black ball replaced final frame deciders to determine the winner.

Final

References 

World Seniors Tour
2018 in snooker
2018 in English sport
Snooker competitions in England
Sports competitions in Sheffield
Seniors Masters